Staraya derevnya (Russian: Старая деревня, "Old village") is an experimental psychedelic band that has been active since 1994. It is named after the historic district of Saint Petersburg. The group's music style is self-defined as "krautfolk" and is characterised by free-form jams, hypnotic rhythmic patterns and an eclectic mix of instruments. Their live performances are described as played in near-total darkness in order to shift audience attention to projected animated paintings, improvised together with the music.

Discography
Studio albums
 Boulder blues (2022), Ramble records
 Inwards opened the floor. (2020), Raash records
 Still life with apples, Collaboration with Hans Grusel's Krankenkabinet (2020), Steep Gloss
 Kadita sessions (2016)
 From inside the log (2010)
 Expedition (1999, Remastered edition 2009)

Live albums
 Oto / Tusk (2020), TQN-aut
 Live at Cafe Oto 13.10.17 (2018), OTORoku

Compilations
 Forgot what was important (2022), Ramble records
 A view from a hill (2017), Linear Obsessional Recordings
 Utterances (2016), Linear Obsessional Recordings
 Gnashing of the teeth of time (2013), Weakie Disks
 Сеть-5 Альмагест (2001), Bomba-Piter

Singles
 I'm thicket (2008)
 Onelegged (2007)

External links

References 

Experimental musical groups
Psychedelic musical groups
Psychedelic folk groups
Russian experimental musical groups
Musical groups from Tel Aviv
Musical groups from London
Musical groups established in 1994